Adrian McQuillan, (8 June 1965, Ballymoney) is a Unionist politician from Northern Ireland representing the Democratic Unionist Party (DUP).

A joiner by training and postman for 18 years, McQuillan was first elected to Coleraine Borough Council in 2001. He was subsequently elected to the Northern Ireland Assembly as a member for East Londonderry at the 2007 Northern Ireland Assembly election but lost his seat in the 2017 Northern Ireland Assembly election. He was elected to Causeway Coast and Glens Borough Council in May 2019.  

He is a member of Moneydig Presbyterian Church.

References

External links
 Profile , BBC.co.uk
 councillor.info profile

1965 births
Living people
People from Ballymoney
Place of birth missing (living people)
Democratic Unionist Party MLAs
Northern Ireland MLAs 2007–2011
Northern Ireland MLAs 2011–2016
Northern Ireland MLAs 2016–2017
Presbyterians from Northern Ireland
Members of Coleraine Borough Council